Jawed Habib  (born 26 June 1963) is an Indian hairstylist, businessman and politician.

Habib owns Jawed Habib Hair and Beauty Ltd., which operates across the country.

Early life and background 
Habib's grandfather Nazir Ahmed served as the official hairdresser for Lord Linlithgow Lord Mountbatten, and Jawaharlal Nehru. His father Habib Ahmed also worked for the President of India at the Rashtrapati Bhavan.

Habib attended the Jawaharlal Nehru University, obtaining a degree in French literature. During this time, he was the captain of the university cricket team and wanted to become a cricketer. At the advice of his father, he later attended the Morris School of Hair Design.

Career 
In 1984, Jawed Habib started working with his father in their first salon, Habib's Hair and Beauty, in The Oberoi Hotel in New Delhi. Wanting international exposure and education, he went to London, UK to study advanced techniques in Morris School of Hairdressing. He started his independent salon, Jawed Habib Hair and Beauty in 2000. He has been the brand ambassador for Sunsilk, a Unilever owned hair care brand from 2000 to 2009 and later went on to promote Panasonic styling products. He has been the official styling partner for Miss India and holds the Limca Record for 410 nonstop haircuts in 24 hours. He is also the only hairstylist to be featured in Times and Forbes magazine.

Habib joined the Bharatiya Janata Party in April 2019.

In January 2022, a video of Jawed Habib using his spit to style a woman's hair during a workshop in Muzaffarnagar, Uttar Pradesh went viral. He later apologised for the act.

Personal life 
Habib is married to Shaheen Habib and they both have two children, Sana Habib and Anosh Habib.

References

Living people
Cosmetics people
People from Delhi
1963 births